Didaskalia or didascalia may refer to:

Didaskalia (theatre)
Didaskalia (journal)
Didascalia Apostolorum
Didaskalia Iakobou
Εισαγωγική Διδασκαλία by Daniel Moscopolites

See also
Didascaliae